Virgilio, the Italian and Spanish form of Virgil may refer to:

Virgilio, Lombardy, a frazione of the comune of Borgo Virgilio in the Italian province of Mantua
Virgilio.it, a website

People with the given name
Virgilio Barco Vargas (1921-1997), Colombian politician and civil engineer, 27th president of Colombia
Virgilio Fiorenzi (1560–1644), Italian Roman Catholic bishop
Virgilio Fossati (1889–1918), Italian footballer
Virgilio Garcillano (born 1948), Filipino politician
Virgilio "Jhong" Hilario (born 1976), Filipino actor, dancer, and politician
Virgilio Noè (1922-2011), Italian Cardinalate
Virgilio Piñera (1912-1979), Cuban writer and poet

Surname
Maria Andrea Virgilio (born 1996), Italian Paralympic archer
Nicholas Anthony Virgilio, 1928-1989, Haiku poet in Camden, New Jersey

Italian masculine given names